In Greek mythology, the name Thersander (Ancient Greek:  Thersandros means 'bold man' derived from   'boldness, braveness' and   'of a man') refers to several distinct characters:

Thersander or Thersandrus, a Corinthian prince as the son of King Sisyphus and the Pleiad Merope, daughter of the Titan Atlas. He was the brother of Ornytion (Porphyrion), Glaucus and Almus. His sons were Haliartus and Coronus, eponyms of Haliartus and Coronea, respectively, and also Proetus, himself the father of Maera who was known to have died a maiden.
Thersander, one of the Heracleidae, son of Agamedidas. His twin daughters Anaxandra and Lathria married the twin sons of Aristodemus, Procles and Eurysthenes.
Thersander of Crete, father, by Arethusa, of a son Hyllus (not to be confused with the son of Heracles). Hyllus was killed by Aeneas in the Trojan War.
Thersander, son of Polynices and one of the Epigoni, killed by Telephus.

Notes

References 

 Apollodorus, The Library with an English Translation by Sir James George Frazer, F.B.A., F.R.S. in 2 Volumes, Cambridge, MA, Harvard University Press; London, William Heinemann Ltd. 1921. ISBN 0-674-99135-4. Online version at the Perseus Digital Library. Greek text available from the same website.
 Pausanias, Description of Greece with an English Translation by W.H.S. Jones, Litt.D., and H.A. Ormerod, M.A., in 4 Volumes. Cambridge, MA, Harvard University Press; London, William Heinemann Ltd. 1918. . Online version at the Perseus Digital Library
Pausanias, Graeciae Descriptio. 3 vols. Leipzig, Teubner. 1903.  Greek text available at the Perseus Digital Library.
Quintus Smyrnaeus, The Fall of Troy translated by Way. A. S. Loeb Classical Library Volume 19. London: William Heinemann, 1913. Online version at theio.com
 Quintus Smyrnaeus, The Fall of Troy. Arthur S. Way. London: William Heinemann; New York: G.P. Putnam's Sons. 1913. Greek text available at the Perseus Digital Library.
Stephanus of Byzantium, Stephani Byzantii Ethnicorum quae supersunt, edited by August Meineike (1790-1870), published 1849. A few entries from this important ancient handbook of place names have been translated by Brady Kiesling. Online version at the Topos Text Project.

Princes in Greek mythology
Achaeans (Homer)
People of the Trojan War
Heracleidae
Corinthian characters in Greek mythology
Cretan characters in Greek mythology
Theban characters in Greek mythology
Corinthian mythology
Cretan mythology
Theban mythology